The Amselsee (also Amselsee Rathen) is a small reservoir in the spa town of Rathen in Saxon Switzerland. It is located in the Free State of Saxony in Eastern Germany.

Reservoir 
To create the Amselsee in Saxon Switzerland, in 1934 a stream, the Grünbach (or Amselgrundbach), the main waterbody in the Amselgrund valley, was impounded by the municipality of Rathen just above its confluence with the Wehlgrund that joins from the rights 1934. The dam is around five metres high. At 127 m above sea level the curved, narrow, roughly 550 m long trout pond is used in summer for boat rides (using slot machines!) as well as for fish breeding and also provides flood prevention. Round trips have been possible since 1969. The trout stock is sometimes mixed with American rainbow trout. Amongst the lakeside vegetation broad-winged damselflies or demoiselles may be seen.

Dam 
The barrier is a straight gravity dam made of rubble stone masonry. It was built in 1934 and taken into service in 1935. According to an article in the Sächsische Zeitung of 31 July 2004 the period of construction lasted from 21 July 1934 to 19 December 1934. It has a drainage outlet with a diameter of 50 cm and a flood spillway with 7 openings, each 2 m wide, in the centre of the dam.

Gallery

External links 

Further information on the Amselsee

Dams completed in 1934
Reservoirs in Saxony
Dams in Saxony
LAmselsee
Bodies of water of Saxon Switzerland
Rathen
Buildings and structures in Sächsische Schweiz-Osterzgebirge
1934 establishments in Germany